The 2009–10 Solomon Islands National Club Championship was the 7th season of the National Club Championship in the Solomon Islands. Koloale won the league for the third time  and also qualified as the Solomon Islands representative for the 2010–11 OFC Champions League through the 2011 Solomon Islands Champions League Playoff against Solomon Warriors. All matches were played at the hillside ground called Lawson Tama Stadium, with an approximate capacity of 20,000.

Teams 
 Gizo United
 Harbour Lights
 Ka'arua
 Koloale
 KOSSA
 Makuru
 Marist
 Naha
 Northern United
 Rendova Devon
 SIPA
 Solomon Warriors
 Soloso
 South Central Gold

Group stage

Group A

Group B

Group C

Knockout stage

Quarter–finals

Semi–finals

Third place match

Final

References 

Solomon Islands S-League seasons
Solomon
football
Solomon
football